("The Autonauts of the Cosmoroute") is a book written by Julio Cortázar in collaboration with Carol Dunlop, who died shortly before it was published. It narrates the couple's extended expedition along the autoroute from Paris to Marseille during the months of May and June 1982.

Publication
The book was written by the authors in Spanish- and French-language versions, which were published simultaneously. An English-language translation (as Autonauts of the Cosmoroute) was published by Archipelago Books in the U.S. in 2007, and Telegram books in the U.K. in 2008.

External links
Lost in Paris with Julio Cortázar and Carol Dunlop (Time: 8:40)

1983 books
Postmodern books
Works by Julio Cortázar
Travel novels
1982 in France
1982 in transport
Autoroutes in France
French travel books
Vans